
Year 303 BC was a year of the pre-Julian Roman calendar. At the time, it was known as the Year of the Consulship of Lentulus and Aventinensis (or, less frequently, year 451 Ab urbe condita). The denomination 303 BC for this year has been used since the early medieval period, when the Anno Domini calendar era became the prevalent method in Europe for naming years.

Events 
 By place 
 Seleucid Empire 
 Seleucus I Nicator expands his kingdom throughout Persia as far east as India, but his advance is eventually halted by Chandragupta Maurya, the founder of the Maurya dynasty of India. In a pact concluded by the two leaders, Seleucus agrees to territorial concessions in exchange for 500 war-trained elephants .
 Seleucus refounds the town of Orrhoa in northern Mesopotamia as a military colony and mixes Greek settlers with its eastern population. He names Edessa in memory of the ancient capital of Macedon.

 Greece 
 Cassander and Lysimachus persuade Seleucus and Ptolemy to join them in trying to destroy Antigonus.
 Demetrius Poliorcetes invades the Peloponnese and occupies Corinth, Sicyon, and Argos in the Peloponnese, and Achaea, Elis and almost all of Arcadia join his side.

 Italy 
 The citizens of Tarentum seek the help of the Spartan general, Cleonymus. He is able to pacify the Lucanians with the agreement of the Romans.

Births 
 Xiaowen of Qin, 34th Ruler of Qin (d. 251 BC)

Deaths

References